United Nations Security Council resolution 1599, adopted unanimously on 28 April 2005, after reaffirming previous resolutions on East Timor (Timor-Leste), particularly resolutions 1543 (2004) and 1573 (2004), the council established the United Nations Office in Timor-Leste (UNOTIL) to follow on from the United Nations Mission of Support to East Timor (UNMISET) as a special political mission for one year until 20 May 2006.

The resolution authorised a peacebuilding, rather than peacekeeping mandate for UNOTIL.

Resolution

Observations
In the preamble of the resolution, the council commended the people and government for the peace and stability achieved in East Timor. UNMISET was also praised for its work in the country. The council noted the Secretary-General Kofi Annan's recommendation that the United Nations should remain in East Timor at a reduced level, and that institutions were in the process of consolidation.

Acts
The resolution established UNOTIL for one year to support the development of state institutions and police, and training regarding democratic governance and human rights through the provision of relevant officers. UNOTIL was to be headed by a Special Representative of the Secretary-General and place emphasis on the transfer of skills and knowledge to deliver better services and build the capacity of institutions.

Meanwhile, the council urged United Nations agencies, donors and financial institutions to continue to contribute towards the development of East Timor and emphasised the need for accountability for serious human rights violations committed in 1999.

See also
 1999 East Timorese crisis
 East Timor Special Autonomy Referendum
 Indonesian occupation of East Timor
 List of United Nations Security Council Resolutions 1501 to 1600 (2003–2005)
 United Nations Transitional Administration in East Timor

References

External links
 
Text of the Resolution at undocs.org

 1599
2005 in East Timor
 1599
April 2005 events